Bernhard Ringrose Wise  (10 February 1858 – 19 September 1916), commonly referred to as B. R. Wise, was an Australian politician. He was a social reformer, seen by some as a traitor to his class, but who was not fully accepted by the labor Movement. He said, "My failure in Sydney has been so complete—my qualities those which Australia does not recognise, my defects those which Australians dislike most." When he died, William Holman said, "There is hardly anything in our public life which we have to consider to-day that cannot be traced back to his brilliant mind and clear foresight … [Wise] held undisputed supremacy as the foremost debater, foremost thinker and foremost public man in the life of New South Wales".

Early life

Wise was born in the Sydney suburb of Petersham. He was the second son of Edward Wise, a judge of the Supreme Court of New South Wales, and Maria Bate (née Smith). After his father's death in 1865, his mother took the family to Leeds, England to put her sons through grammar school, where their "homemade clothes exposed us to ridicule and bullying". She moved to Rugby and took work, so that Wise could be educated at Rugby School as a day student.

Wise won a £90-a-year scholarship to The Queen's College, Oxford, where he had a distinguished career, being Cobden Prizeman in 1878 and gaining a first-class in the honour school of law in 1880. He was president of the Oxford Union and president of the Oxford University Athletics Club (OUAC).

Wise was amateur mile champion of Great Britain, 1879–81, and his interest in athletics led to his co-founding the Amateur Athletic Association, alongside Clement Jackson, and Montague Shearman, of which he was elected the first president. This became a very important body whose influence was eventually extended all over the world. In 1882, he moved to London and worked closely with the social reformer, Arnold Toynbee.

Wise was called to the bar of the Middle Temple in April 1883; and, in August 1883, he returned to Sydney with his fiancée, Lilian Margaret Baird, whom he married in April 1884. He was admitted as a barrister in August 1883 and began to build up a successful practice.

Later in life in November 1898, while the member of the New South Wales Legislative Assembly for Ashfield, he was appointed a Queen's Counsel.

Political career

In February 1887, Wise was elected to the Legislative Assembly for the working class district of South Sydney, advocating direct taxation, payment of members, an eight-hour day and free trade. On 27 May, became Attorney-General of New South Wales in Henry Parkes's fourth ministry. Eight months later he resigned because as Attorney-General he was prohibited from taking briefs and he was defeated at the January 1889 election. In the 1890 maritime strike, he supported the right of the workers to strike, and won back his seat in South Sydney, despite his education and accent.

Wise had always been interested in federation and in May 1890 suggested that a journal should be established for the discussion of federal problems. A strong editorial committee was formed and two numbers of the Australian Federalist appeared at the beginning of 1891. In November of that year, when the retirement of Parkes necessitated a new leader being elected, Wise might possibly have been given the position, but though nominated he retired in favour of George Reid. In 1894, he was returned as member for Sydney-Flinders. His failure to choose sides between Reid and Parkes during a no-confidence debate left him isolated and he was defeated for re-election in 1895.

Federation

He was elected as a representative of New South Wales at the 1897 Federal Convention and was a member of the judiciary committee. He fought for Federation in the referendum campaign of 1898 and at the New South Wales election allied himself with Edmund Barton. In August 1898, he was returned as member for Ashfield. He left the Free Trade Party because he felt that free trade was being put before federalism. As he afterwards phrased it, "I preferred nationhood to local politics". But as a candidate for the Federal House of Representatives rural seat of Canobolas, though really a convinced freetrader, he was labelled a protectionist on account of his association with Lyne and Barton, and he was seen as a "city" barrister. A freetrader gained the seat, and Wise was lost to federal politics.

Legal reform and latter life

Wise was Attorney-General in Lyne's ministry from September 1899 to June 1904 and, from July 1901, was also Minister of Justice. He was now able to put through some of his ideas for social reform and succeeded in passing important legislation, including the Industrial Arbitration Act (1901), the Early Closing Act (1899), the Old-age Pensions Act (1900) and the Women's Franchise Act (1902). He resigned his seat in the Legislative Assembly to accept an appointment to the Legislative Council on 30 October 1900, to pilot the Arbitration bill through the Council. More than once he had a State Children's bill passed by the Council only to have it rejected by the Assembly and its ideas were incorporated in the Neglected Children and Juvenile Offenders Act (1905). He was acting-Premier for part of 1903⁠–04.

When John See resigned as Premier, Wise was considered for appointment, however the Governor Sir Harry Rawson refused considering him to be able but unreliable and in due course asked Thomas Waddell to be Premier. Wise refused to serve in Waddell's ministry.

He subsequently travelled and, while in South America in 1906, contracted malaria which affected his health for the remainder of his days. Most of his time was spent in England and on 10 March 1908 his seat in the Legislative Council was declared vacant due to his absence for two sessions. In May 1915, he was appointed Agent-General for New South Wales in London. He worked hard despite his ill-health and died suddenly in Kensington in September 1916 (aged 58). His wife survived him with one son.

Writings

He was the author of Facts and Fallacies of Modern Protection (1879); Industrial Freedom A Study in Politics (1892), a more complete statement of the freetrade case; The Commonwealth of Australia (1909), a popular book on conditions in Australia at that time; and The Making of the Australian Commonwealth (1913), which, though sometimes one-sided and generally too much confined to events in New South Wales, is an interesting and valuable document.

Wise had also at one point socialised with Scottish-Australian poet and bush balladeer Will H. Ogilvie (1869–1963); they also played chess.

Personality
Wise's personality incited marked responses. "A most agreeable companion" (7th Earl of Beauchamp, NSW Governor), with a "clear musical voice" (the Age), and "attractive manner" (John Quick), but with "inveterate personal and political enemies" (W.B. Melville).  "A most unstable politician" (Joseph Carruthers), "a sort of Australian Randolph Churchill" (Review of Reviews), "a rising young man who had somehow never risen" (Beauchamp).

Works

Notes

External links

 
 

1858 births
1916 deaths
Australian federationists
Australian non-fiction writers
Members of the New South Wales Legislative Assembly
Attorneys General of New South Wales
British social reformers
Burials at Brookwood Cemetery
Agents-General for New South Wales
Alumni of The Queen's College, Oxford
Presidents of the Oxford Union
Australian King's Counsel